"Cataclysmic Pink" is the fifth single to be produced by multi-instrumentalist/composer Tim Scott, first released on iTunes on 17 December 2010.

The cover features a picture of the fashion model Anne Dos Santos holding Tim Scott’s custom sparkly pink Jackson signature guitar shot by the photographer Bernie Cavanagh.

This single was recorded, mixed and produced by Tim Scott at Acer Studios, Greater Manchester, mastered on 16 December 2010 by Geoff Pesche in Suite 5 at Abbey Road Studios, London.

Critical reception

Sarah Walters of CityLife gave the song a positive review stating:

Formats and track listings
Download single
"Cataclysmic Pink (Radio Edit)" – 3:32
"Cataclysmic Pink (Silver Snowflake Mix)" – 5:44

Personnel

 Tim Scott – lead guitar, rhythm guitar, bass guitar, synth, drums, percussion, drum programming

Production

 Tim Scott – producer, engineer, mixing
 Geoff Pesche – mastering
 Laura Turner – artwork/graphic design
 Bernie Cavanagh – photography

Release history

References

2010 singles
2010 songs